The 2017 Pan American Ice Hockey Tournament was the fourth edition of the Pan American Ice Hockey Tournament, an annual event run by the Federación Deportiva de México de Hockey sobre Hielo, sanctioned by the International Ice Hockey Federation. It will take place in Mexico City, Mexico between June 5 and 11, 2017. Mexico "A" won their first ever Pan American Tournament, winning all six of its games and defeating Colombia (Yellow) in the final. Argentina "A" finished third after defeating Mexico "B" in the bronze medal game.

Participants
The following nine teams in three groups will compete in the tournament, with Argentina, Brazil, Colombia and Mexico bringing both "A" and "B" teams.

Group A

Group B

 Chile
 (host)

Group C

 (host)

First round

Standings

Group A

Group B

Group C

Rankings

Schedules
(UTC–06:00)

Group A

Group B

Group C

Second round

Standings

5th–9th place

Schedules
(UTC–06:00)

Final round

Bronze medal game
(UTC–06:00)

Final
(UTC–06:00)

Final standings

References

Pan American Ice Hockey Tournament
Pan American Ice Hockey Tournament
2017
2017
June 2017 sports events in Mexico